Washington Crossing Bridge (officially the Washington Crossing Toll Supported Bridge) is a truss bridge spanning the Delaware River that connects Washington Crossing, Hopewell Township in Mercer County, New Jersey with Washington Crossing, Upper Makefield Township in Bucks County, Pennsylvania. It was built in 1904 by the Taylorsville Delaware Bridge Company. The bridge is currently owned and operated by the Delaware River Joint Toll Bridge Commission.

History

On February 14, 1831, an act was passed by the New Jersey Legislature and concurred by the Pennsylvania General Assembly, creating the Taylorsville Delaware Bridge Company. By the act's provisions, a bridge was to be located at Taylor's Ferry, close to where George Washington crossed the Delaware River in 1776. This timber bridge was constructed beginning in 1831 and was completed in 1834. Its six spans gave it a total length of 875 feet. The first bridge remained in service until it was swept away by the flood of January 8, 1841. A replacement bridge was constructed shortly afterward and remained in service until it was carried away by the flood of October 10, 1903. In 1904, the bridge's current steel superstructure was built.

The DRJTBC bought the private toll bridge in 1922.

The flood of August 19, 1955, did considerable damage to Washington Crossing Bridge. Floating debris in the form of whole trees, steel barrels and even houses smashed against the bridge, resulting in damage to all six spans. More than half the bridge's bottom chords were bent or twisted beyond repair. These members were replaced with new fabricated steel members and the bridge was reopened to traffic on November 17, 1955.

During the fall of 1994, the bridge underwent an extensive structural rehabilitation. As described by the Delaware River Joint Toll Bridge Commission, 
Many truss members were replaced with new fabricated galvanized steel. Floor system members and the open steel grid deck were replaced in the first three bays of each end span. All remaining structural steel was blast cleaned, metallized, and painted. A new wooden sidewalk was installed and renovations were made at both approaches to the bridge.

Structure

The roadway is made of a grate.The bridge's substructures, composed of rubble stone-faced masonry, are from the original 1831 bridge, while its superstructure dates to 1904. Five piers (one of which has been faced with mortar) and two abutments support the bridge. The downriver (south) side of Washington Crossing Bridge supports a cantilevered, wood planked pedestrian sidewalk that was added in 1926.

Floods
The remnants of Hurricane Ivan caused heavy rainfall on September 17 and 18 of 2004;  fell over a 12-hour period. Flood peaks along the main section of the Delaware River were the highest since the flood of 1955. The bridge was temporarily closed.

Unusually heavy rains experienced in late March 2005 and early April 2005 combined with melting snow resulted in another flood. One of the piers of Washington Crossing Bridge had its masonry core exposed after being battered by a floating object. In the aftermath of the flood, the Delaware River Joint Toll Bridge Commission requested $500,000 in emergency flood repairs. Although the bridge remained opened for a short time following the flooding, it was closed on April 7, 2005, when receding flood waters revealed the extent of the damage to the pier. The bridge was reopened to continuous traffic on May 4, 2005, although it was closed for nighttime repairs beginning May 18.

In 2006, the Delaware River experienced  of rain from June 23 to June 28. The river's peak levels were comparable to those of the April 2005 flood. Washington Crossing Bridge was closed until July 1, when it reopened to vehicular and pedestrian traffic at 10:15 a.m.

See also
List of crossings of the Delaware River

References

External links

Advanced Hydrologic Prediction Service

Delaware River Joint Toll Bridge Commission
1904 establishments in New Jersey
1904 establishments in Pennsylvania
Road bridges in Pennsylvania
Bridges over the Delaware River
Bridges in Mercer County, New Jersey
Bridges completed in 1904
Bridges in Bucks County, Pennsylvania
Road bridges in New Jersey
Former toll bridges in New Jersey
Former toll bridges in Pennsylvania
Hopewell Township, Mercer County, New Jersey
Steel bridges in the United States
Warren truss bridges in the United States
Interstate vehicle bridges in the United States